The Glass Cage may refer to:

 The Glass Cage (1955 film), a British crime film
 The Glass Cage (1965 film), an Israeli-French film
 "The Glass Cage" (Mission Impossible episode)
 The Glass Cage: Automation and Us, a 2014 book by Nicholas G. Carr